Urbs beata Jerusalem dicta pacis visio is the first line of a 7th or 8th-century hymn sung in the Office of the Dedication of a Roman Catholic church.

Text
The hymn comprises eight stanzas, together with a doxology. The text is scripturally inspired by Ephesians ii. 20, 1 Peter ii. 5, and Revelation xxi. The translation below is by John Mason Neale.

The metre is a version of the trochaic septenarius rhythm, often used for hymns in the medieval period (see Trochaic septenarius#In Christian hymns). In the 17th century, under Pope Urban VIII, a group of correctors revised the hymn, replacing the unquantitative, accentual, trochaic rhythm with quantitative, iambic metre, and the stanza appeared in the Breviary with divided lines:

Coelestis Urbs Jerusalem,
Beata pacis visio,
Quæ celsa de viventibus
Saxis ad astra tolleris,
Sponsæque ritu cingeris
Mille Angelorum millibus.

Originally, the first four stanzas of "Urbs beata Jerusalem" were usually assigned, in the Office of the Dedication of a church, to Vespers and Matins, while the last four were given to Lauds. After the revision, the hymn for Lauds was changed to "Alto ex Olympi vertice".

References

Latin-language Christian hymns